Jaroslav Pospíšil (born 1973) is a former Czech slalom canoeist who competed from the mid-1990s to the early 2010s.

He won five gold medals in the C2 team event at the ICF Canoe Slalom World Championships (1995, 1999, 2003, 2006, 2007). He also won four medals in the same event at the European Championships (2 golds, 1 silver and 1 bronze).

His partner in the boat until 2006 was Jaroslav Pollert. From 2007 to 2009 it was David Mrůzek.

World Cup individual podiums

References

Czech male canoeists
Living people
1973 births
Medalists at the ICF Canoe Slalom World Championships